Guery Agreda (born 19 January 1942) is a Bolivian footballer. He played in six matches for the Bolivia national football team from 1967 to 1973. He was also part of Bolivia's squad for the 1967 South American Championship.

References

1942 births
Living people
Bolivian footballers
Bolivia international footballers
Association football midfielders
Sportspeople from Cochabamba